Krista Thompson is an art historian. She serves as Weinberg College Board of Visitors Professor and Professor in the Department of Art History at Northwestern University. Her work focuses on modern and contemporary art and visual culture of the Africa diaspora, particularly the medium of photography.

Thompson earned her PhD in 2002 from Emory University.

In 2009 Thompson won the Driskell Prize from the High Museum of Art in Atlanta, recognizing "an original and important contribution to the field of African American art or art history."

Works
 An Eye for the Tropics: Photography, Tourism, and Framing the Caribbean Picturesque (Duke University Press, 2006)
 Developing Blackness: Studio Photographs of “Over the Hill” Nassau in the Independence Era (National Art Gallery of the Bahamas, 2008) 
 Shine: The Visual Economy of Light in African Diasporic Aesthetic Practice (Duke University Press, 2015)

References

Living people
Northwestern University faculty
Historians of photography
Women art historians
Year of birth missing (living people)